The Red Chief: As Told By the Last of His Tribe is a 1953 book by Ion Idriess about Gambu Ganuurru or Red Kangaroo, a tribal leader in the Gunnedah region in the 18th century prior to European settlement.

Plot
The young warrior Red Kangaroo becomes a chief of his tribe – the  Red Chief of the Gunnedah district. His story is handed down through the generations of his tribe and given by the last survivor, Bungaree, to the white settlers of the district.

Background
Bungaree reportedly told the story of the Red Chief to a police officer, Senior Sgt John Ewing in the early 19th century. Notes of this talk were taken by Ewin's son Stan and wound up in the possession of a historian, who sent them to Idriess, who decided to write the book.

References

External links
Full copy of book at Internet Archive ("No longer available" in November 2021.)
The Red Chief at AustLit

1953 Australian novels
North West Slopes
Novels set in New South Wales
Novels by Ion Idriess